Group D of UEFA Euro 2004 was one of four groups in the final tournament's initial group stage. It began on 15 June and was completed on 23 June. The group consisted of Germany, the Netherlands, the Czech Republic and Latvia.

The Czech Republic won the group and advanced to the quarter-finals, along with the Netherlands. Germany and Latvia failed to advance.

Teams

Notes

Standings

In the quarter-finals,
The winner of Group D, Czech Republic, advanced to play the runner-up of Group C, Denmark.
The runner-up of Group D, Netherlands, advanced to play the winner of Group C, Sweden.

Matches

Czech Republic vs Latvia

Germany vs Netherlands

Latvia vs Germany

Netherlands vs Czech Republic

Netherlands vs Latvia

Germany vs Czech Republic

References

External links
UEFA Euro 2004 Group D

Group D
Group
Group
Czech Republic at UEFA Euro 2004
Latvia at UEFA Euro 2004